Robert Daly is the name of:

Robert A. Daly, American business executive
Robert Daly (sprinter) (born 1978), Irish track and field sprinter
Robert Daly (bishop) (1783–1872), Bishop of Cashel and Waterford
Robert Daly (priest) Anglican Bishop of Kildare, 1564-1583
Robert Daly (director),  director of the Kissinger Institute on China and the United States

See also
Robert Daley (born 1930), American author
Robert Daley (producer), American film producer
Bob Dailey (1953–2016), retired Canadian ice hockey player
Bob Daily, American television producer and screenwriter
USS Callister, an episode of the dystopian anthology series Black Mirror starring Jesse Plemons as reclusive programmer Robert Daly